Events from the 1090s in England.

Incumbents
Monarch – William II

Events
 1090
 After buying the allegiance of several local barons, King William II takes control of eastern Normandy.
 1091
 2 February – William II invades western Normandy.
 July – Malcolm III of Scotland invades England reaching as far as Durham.
 23 October – London Tornado of 1091: A T8/F4 tornado is recorded in London, which destroys London Bridge and badly damages St Mary-le-Bow church.
 Treaty of Caen signed by King William II of England and his brother Robert II, Duke of Normandy, dividing Normandy between them.
 William and Robert jointly invade Scotland. King Malcolm III  submits.
 1092
 May – William II annexes Cumbria from the Scottish Celtic kingdom of Strathclyde and builds Carlisle Castle.
 9 May – Lincoln Cathedral consecrated (made sacred).
 18 October – Walcher of Malvern correctly predicts the time of a lunar eclipse.
 High tides cause great flooding in Britain. 
 1093
 6 March – Frankish monk, philosopher and theologian Anselm is nominated as Archbishop of Canterbury; he is consecrated on 4 December.
 8 April – construction of Winchester Cathedral by Bishop Walkelin is completed.
 11 August – construction of Durham Cathedral begins.
 13 November – King Malcolm III of Scotland is killed at the Battle of Alnwick during an attempted invasion of England.
 Durham Priory re-establishes a monastic house on the Holy Island of Lindisfarne.
 Normans occupy southern Wales, constructing Cardiff and Pembroke Castles.
 1094
 February – William II and Anselm quarrel about investiture and the overlordship of Church lands.
 19 March – William II unsuccessfully invades Normandy.
 Welsh expel the Marcher Lords and destroy all Norman strongholds in Wales, except Pembroke Castle.
 1095
 January – Robert de Mowbray, Earl of Northumberland, rebels. William II captures Newcastle upon Tyne and Bamburgh, ending the revolt.
 25 February – a council at Rockingham is held to resolve the dispute between Anselm and William II, but fails to do so.
 May – Papal legate forces a reconciliation between William II and Anselm.
 1096
 Teaching at what will become the University of Oxford is recorded.
 King William II takes control of the Duchy of Normandy while his brother Robert II, Duke of Normandy is on the First Crusade.
 Construction of Norwich Cathedral begun. Herbert de Losinga, first Bishop of Norwich, establishes a Benedictine priory at Norwich and, shortly afterwards, an episcopal grammar school, Norwich School.
 1097
 October – Edgar Ætheling overthrows Donald III of Scotland and places his nephew Edgar on the Scottish throne.
 8 November – Anselm leaves England following disagreements with William II.
 Construction of Westminster Hall.
 1098
 June or July – in the Battle of Anglesey Sound, a fleet led by Magnus Barefoot, King of Norway, reverses an Anglo-Norman invasion of north Wales.
 1099
 11 November – flooding of Mount's Bay, Cornwall.

Births
 1095
Hugh Bigod, 1st Earl of Norfolk (died 1177)
 1096
 King Stephen of England (died 1154)

Deaths
 1092
 7 May – Remigius de Fécamp, Bishop of Lincoln
 1094
 21 November – Simeon, Abbot of Ely (born c. 994)
 1095
 19 January – Wulfstan, Bishop of Worcester (born 1008)
 26 June – Robert the Lotharingian, Bishop of Hereford
 1096
 2 January – William de St-Calais, Bishop of Durham and counsellor of William II
 1097
 January/February – Odo, Earl of Kent (born c. 1030s in Normandy; died on First Crusade)
 c. 1097/8 – Baldwin, Abbot of Bury St Edmunds and royal doctor
 1098
 3 January – Walkelin, Bishop of Winchester
 1099
 3 December – Saint Osmund, Bishop of Salisbury and Lord Chancellor

References